Music from the Source is a live album by bassist Cecil McBee's Sextet recorded at Sweet Basil in 1977 and released on the Enja label.

Reception

In his review for AllMusic,  Scott Yanow stated "The music is spiritual in nature, sometimes quite modal and in the adventurous genre of John Coltrane without being derivative. A fine live set."

Track listing
All compositions by Cecil McBee
 "Agnez (With Respect to Roy Haynes)" - 19:04
 "God Spirit" - 7:59
 "First Song in the Day" - 17:04

Personnel
Cecil McBee - bass
Joe Gardner - trumpet, flugelhorn
Chico Freeman - tenor saxophone, flute
Dennis Moorman - piano
Steve McCall - drums 
Famoudou Don Moye -  congas

References

 
1978 live albums
Cecil McBee live albums
Enja Records live albums